The Ukrainian Youth Association (transliterated as , known by the acronym , , pronounced "", and commonly rendered as CYM) is a youth organization in Ukraine, Argentina, Australia, Belgium, Canada, Estonia, France, Great Britain, Germany, and the United States.
The organization plans to create units in New Zealand.

History 

The Ukrainian Youth Association was founded in Ukraine in 1925 by Mykola Pavlushkov, who waged a civil war against the 1917 October Russian Revolution.

Program sections

 Sumeniata (youngest members) - ages 3 to 5
 Molodshe Yunatstvo (younger members) - ages 6 to 12
 Starshe Yunatstvo (older members) - ages 13 – 17
 Druszynnyky (Councillors/Leaders) - ages 18 – 49
 Seiniory (Seniors) - ages 50+

A Ukrainian who attributes themselves to the СУМ organization is named Sumivets.

See also

Archives 
There is a Canadian Ukrainian Youth Association fonds at Library and Archives Canada. The archival reference number is R3438.

References

External links

UYA/СУМ Homepage

Scouting and Guiding in Ukraine
Ukrainian-Canadian culture
Anti-communist organizations
Ukrainian nationalist organizations
Ukrainian diaspora organizations
Youth organizations established in 1925
Non-aligned Scouting organizations